Saltisedes is a genus of rove beetles.

Species
 Saltisedes brunneus Kubota, 1944
 Saltisedes clavatus (Raffray, 1882)
 Saltisedes hainanensis Yin & Nomura in Yin, Nomura, Chandler & Li, 2013
 Saltisedes hamotoides (Schaufuss, 1882)
 Saltisedes javanicus (Raffray, 1882)
 Saltisedes kojimai Nomura & Yin in Yin, Nomura, Chandler & Li, 2013
 Saltisedes longispina (Raffray, 1903)
 Saltisedes weiri (Chandler, 2001)
 Saltisedes yahiroi Nomura & Yin in Yin, Nomura, Chandler & Li, 2013

References

Pselaphitae
Pselaphinae genera